Sarah Jane Smith: Fatal Consequences is a Big Finish Productions audio drama based on the long-running British science fiction television series Doctor Who. It stars Elisabeth Sladen reprising her role as Sarah Jane Smith.

Plot 
The Crimson Chapter, a doomsday cult who Sarah Jane encountered in Buried Secrets, believe that she is the Herald, whose presence portends the end of the world, because of a manuscript written centuries ago by a duke who Sarah Jane encountered in the 15th century. The Crimson Chapter have given up waiting for the Cult of Demnos to destroy the world, and have determined to fulfill their own prophesy of armaggedon by releasing a banned biological weapon that will destroy all life on Earth.

Cast
Sarah Jane Smith – Elisabeth Sladen
Josh Townsend – Jeremy James
Will Sullivan – Tom Chadbon
Keeper – Jacqueline Pearce
Dexter – David Gooderson
Maude – Patricia Leventon
Emily – Katarina Olsson
Newsreader – Shaun Ley
Sir Donald – Stephen Greif

Continuity
 This story involves Sarah Jane in events flowing from the Doctor Who television serial The Masque of Mandragora.

Notes 
 Both Tom Chadbon and David Gooderson appeared in Fourth Doctor serials produced in 1979. Chadbon played Duggan in City of Death while Gooderson was the second actor to play Davros, the creator of the Daleks, in Destiny of the Daleks.
 Tom Chadbon, in addition to appearing in the Doctor Who serial City of Death with Tom Baker, also appeared in the Colin Baker television serial The Mysterious Planet (episodes 1 to 4 of The Trial of a Time Lord) in 1986. For Big Finish, Chadbon has also appeared with 8th Doctor Paul McGann, during The Eighth Doctor Adventures (2007), in the serial No More Lies. His science fiction credits include appearing in the BBC TV series Blake's 7, as Del Grant in the series 2 episode Countdown. He is also famous for playing Sandra's husband in the long running BBC situation comedy The Liver Birds.
 David Gooderson has extensive acting credits in television and radio going back forty years. He has twice been a member of the BBC Radio Drama Company, and has made over four hundred broadcasts. His science fiction credits outside Doctor Who include appearing in two cult radio shows: playing Tidy, the sentient android, in series 2 of Earthsearch; and the barman in The Hitchhiker's Guide to the Galaxy.
 Jacqueline Pearce appeared in Doctor Who with Colin Baker and Patrick Troughton, in the TV serial The Two Doctors. Her science fiction credits include appearing in the BBC TV series Blake's 7 from 1978 to 1981, as series regular Supreme Commander Servalan.
 Stephen Greif's science fiction credits include appearing in the BBC TV series Blake's 7 in 1978, as series regular Space Commander Travis.

References

External links
Big Finish Productions – Sarah Jane Smith: Fatal Consequences

Fatal Consequences
2006 audio plays
Plays by David Bishop